Benjamín Fernando Hernández Bustamante (born 30 March 1954) is a Mexican lawyer and politician affiliated with the Institutional Revolutionary Party. As of 2014 he served as Deputy of the LIX Legislature of the Mexican Congress as a plurinominal representative.

References

1954 births
Living people
People from Oaxaca City
20th-century Mexican lawyers
Members of the Chamber of Deputies (Mexico)
Institutional Revolutionary Party politicians
Politicians from Oaxaca
Deputies of the LIX Legislature of Mexico